Mundos Opuestos is a Chilean reality show produced and broadcast on Canal 13. 22 participants (10 famous and 12 unknown) initially entered production, being isolated in a house in Pirque, southeast of Santiago de Chile. The premise of the competition is that participants will be divided into two groups, one about living "the life of the future" and the other about living "the life of the past". The two worlds present in the house were separated by a glass wall, allowing both groups to observe the actions of the other, the direct interaction between the two groups of participants is given in the courtyard, known as "the present". Participants of the two existing groups compete each week in various physical tests to determine which group will live in the past, and which will live in the future and to determine which participant will be eliminated from the competition.

The winners of the first version of Mundos Opuestos was Sebastian Roca and Viviana Flores. The reality was premiere on 15 January 2012 at 23.00 and the grand final was premiere on 27 June 2012 at 22.30. This reality was a total success in Chile, being watched by 2.9 million viewers per episode, having a second part premiered on 13 January 2013 on Canal 13 (Chile).

Season 1

Season 2

Mundos Opuestos around the World

Rules 
There is a contestant who is "protected for the times". She (or he) is the only participant who has immunity, and not at risk of being eliminated. She can move freely between the past, present and future; but cannot deliver goods from the future to the past or vice versa. She has a blue suit to differentiate her from other participants. In the case of the tie, she is the sole decider of the nominee to the council of past and future.

"Punished for the times": The participant with the fewest votes via public text message, who becomes nominated for elimination.

"The Present": A place where all participants can visit. However, no participant may circulate in the present between midnight and 10:00 am.

"Secret room":  Located in the future and delivers additional amenities and surprises. Available to the couple of competitors from the winning team who has won the "Wellness Challenge" of the week. Also the room allows couples to communicate with family members or close friends via video.

References

External links
 

2012 Chilean television series debuts
2012 Chilean television series endings
Chilean reality television series